Doak Field (born October 8, 1958, in Burnet, Texas) is a former American football linebacker who played seven games in the National Football League for the St. Louis Cardinals in the 1981 season. He played college football at Baylor.

Early life and college career
Field grew up in Burnet, Texas, where he played football for Burnet High School. He initially committed to play football for Texas but switched his commitment to Baylor. With Baylor, he won the 1979 Peach Bowl, making an interception late in the game to help secure the win. He played alongside College Football Hall of Fame linebacker Mike Singletary at Baylor; during their senior years in 1980, the Austin American-Statesman speculated that Field may have had the better season despite earning less recognition. Field earned Southwest Conference Defensive Player of the Week honors for an October 1980 game against Houston in which he recorded an interception, a fumble recovery, a blocked field goal, and seventeen tackles.

Professional career
The Philadelphia Eagles selected Field in the seventh round of the 1981 NFL Draft. However, the Eagles cut him from the roster before the 1981 season began. The St. Louis Cardinals signed Field in October to replace injured linebacker Tim Kearney. Field played in seven games for the Cardinals, including a November game against the Eagles; he primarily played on special teams. He injured his knee in a December game against the New Orleans Saints and was placed on injured reserve for the remainder of the season. The Cardinals released Field prior to the 1982 season.

References

1958 births
Living people
American football linebackers
Players of American football from Texas
Baylor Bears football players
St. Louis Cardinals (football) players